Surface Laptop Studio is a newly introduced product line by Microsoft at their Surface Event on September 22, 2021. It was announced by the company alongside the Surface Go 3 and Surface Pro 8, Surface Duo 2 and several Surface accessories. The device is a new form factor featuring a dual-pivoting screen that flips into tablet mode. The laptop is powered by Windows 11 operating system.

On 4 Feb, 2022, Microsoft announced the general availability for organisations across industries in the UAE of its Surface Laptop Studio and Surface Pro 8.

Features 

 Windows 11 operating system
 Intel Tiger Lake 11th Gen Core i5 or Core i7 processor
 Intel Iris Xe graphics, Nvidia GeForce RTX 3050 Ti (Consumer), or NVIDIA RTX A2000 (Enterprise) GPU with 4 GB of GDDR6 RAM
 120 Hz refresh rate and Dolby Vision support
 16 or 32 GB of LPDDR4X RAM
 256 GB to 2 TB NVME SSD storage
 2 Thunderbolt 4 USB-C ports

Configurations

Hardware 

 A new three-position display with a complete overhaul.
 14.4-inch touch display with 2400 x 1600 pixels (201 ppi) and a 3:2 aspect ratio
 The first Surface Laptop to contain 2 USB-C ports with Thunderbolt 4.
 It comes with a removable SSD.
 Precision Haptic touchpad

Software 

The Surface Laptop Studio will be powered by the new Windows 11 operating system with a 30-day trial of Microsoft 365. Consumer models will get the Home edition and the business models will get the Pro edition of the operating system. The device also supports Windows Hello login using biometric facial recognition.

Timeline

References

Studio
2-in-1 PCs
Computer-related introductions in 2021